Eclipse Center, formerly known as Beloit Plaza or Beloit Mall, is a mixed-use development and former shopping mall in Beloit, Wisconsin. It is undergoing a renovation with the aim of making it a pivotal point in the city. It formerly housed the department store Elder-Beerman, and still houses several Rock County government offices, a convention center and bar, and two School District of Beloit charter schools. There are also an automotive shop and a culinary program run by students from Beloit Memorial High School.

Overview
Set on a high profile,  site on a bluff overlooking Riverside Drive (US Highway 51) and the Rock River, the  Beloit Plaza was the first major shopping center in Rock County. Early success was followed by a decline resulting from competition with the Janesville Mall and developments in Janesville and Beloit with easy access to Interstate 90. Several redevelopment efforts failed, but with the involvement of Beloit billionaire Ken Hendricks beginning in 2004, a new plan to make it a mixed-use development with public services and other facilities has raised local hopes for the site.

Tenants included an Elder-Beerman store, Cardinal Stritch University, the University of Wisconsin–Extension, the Beloit Public Library, the Rock County Health Department, the Beloit Area Community Health Center,  School District of Beloit facilities, a convention and banquet facility, and smaller businesses.
Elder-Beerman closed in 2018.

The mall includes an event venue known as the Eclipse Events Centre.

References

External links
Hendricks Development Group

Buildings and structures in Beloit, Wisconsin
Defunct shopping malls in the United States
Shopping malls in Wisconsin
Shopping malls established in 1966